Appa Saheb Adke was an Indian educator and administrator, and the vice-chancellor of Karnatak University in Dharwad, India, after the tenure of Dr. D. C. Pavate ended in 1967.  Prior to this, Dr. Adke was the principal of Karnataka Regional Engineering College, Surathkal.

References

 Efforts to start the Gulbarga University - Dr. Adke
 Dr. A.S. Adke, former Vice-Chancellor, Karnataka University. Dharwad and Ex-Principal, Karnataka Regional Engineering College, Surathkal.
 Community dominance and political modernisation: the Lingayats 

Indian academic administrators
Living people
Academic staff of Karnatak University
Year of birth missing (living people)